Binatlı Yılmaz Spor Kulübü is a Turkish Cypriot football club based in Morphou.

Colors
The club colors are yellow and green.

Stadium
The club's home stadium is  Üner Berkalp Zafer Stadı.

Honors
Birinci Lig: (1)
 2002–03
Kıbrıs Kupası and Federasyon Kupası: (1)
 2005

References

Football clubs in Northern Cyprus